This article shows the rosters of all participating teams at the men's indoor volleyball tournament at the 2013 Mediterranean Games in Mersin.















References

External links
 Official website

2015
Volleyball at the 2013 Mediterranean Games